Adnan bin Abu Hassan (born 17 February 1970) is a Malaysian politician. He was the Member of the Parliament of Malaysia for the seat of Kuala Pilah of Negeri Sembilan since November 2022. He is a member of the United Malays National Organisation (UMNO) a component party of the ruling BN coalition.

Election results

Honours 
  :
  Knight of the Order of Loyal Service to Negeri Sembilan (DBNS) – Dato' (2016)

References 

1970 births
Living people
Malaysian politicians
People from Negeri Sembilan
Malaysian people of Malay descent
Malaysian Muslims
United Malays National Organisation politicians
Members of the Negeri Sembilan State Legislative Assembly
Members of the Dewan Rakyat
Members of the 15th Malaysian Parliament